William E. Caswell was an American physicist.

William Caswell may also refer to:
William Caswell (politician), 18th-century American politician
Bill Caswell, musician
William Caswell, owner of Daniel H. and William T. Caswell Houses, Texas
William Caswell, owner of Caswell House (Troy, Michigan)